McIntosh Municipal Airport  was a public use airport located one nautical mile (2 km) south of the central business district of McIntosh, a city in Corson County, South Dakota, United States. The airport property is owned by the City of McIntosh.

Facilities and aircraft 
McIntosh Municipal Airport covered an area of 66 acres (27 ha) at an elevation of 2,251 feet (686 m) above mean sea level. It had one runway designated 14/32 with a turf and gravel surface measuring 3,700 by 150 feet (1,128 x 46 m).

For the 12-month period ending September 25, 2012, the airport had 14 general aviation aircraft operations, an average of 1 per month.

The airport was closed in 2015 and the runway has since been removed.

References

External links 
 Aerial image as of September 1997 from USGS The National Map
  at South Dakota DOT Airport Directory
 McIntosh Municipal Airport (8D6) at AirNav

Defunct airports in the United States
Airports in South Dakota
Buildings and structures in Corson County, South Dakota
Transportation in Corson County, South Dakota